The Egyptian-Lebanese House is an Egyptian publishing house that was established in 1985 AD.

History
The Egyptian-Lebanese House was established in 1985 AD. The house has published many literary publications, books and Arabic novels, and has also participated in many local and international book fairs. The publications of the house vary and cover different topics, on top of which is history. The house has published various works in different fields, including: Critical studies, Religious books, Poetry, trips ethics, Anecdotal collections, Novels (historical - social - detective - philosophical - psychological horror), Children's books, Articles and Thoughts and Marketing.

In 2009, The Egyptian-Lebanese House was honored Publishing and Technology branch of Sheikh Zayed Book Award.

Authors
The Egyptian-Lebanese House has published the works of many well-known contemporary authors:
Isaad_Younis
Kahlil Gibran
Ihsan Abdel Quddous
Ashraf El-Ashmawi
Walaa Kamal
Radwa El Aswad

References

External links

Conglomerate companies of Egypt
Publishing companies established in 1985
Publishing companies of Egypt
1985 establishments in Egypt